Roger Smith and Paul Wekesa were the defending champions, but did not participate this year.

Jeremy Bates and Patrick Baur won the title, defeating Rikard Bergh and Per Henricsson 6–1, 4–6, 6–1 in the final.

Seeds

  Matt Anger /  Tim Pawsat (first round)
  Paul Haarhuis /  Menno Oosting (semifinals)
  Jeremy Bates /  Patrick Baur (champions)
  Rikard Bergh /  Per Henricsson (final)

Draw

Draw

External links
Draw

Doubles